Litke is a lunar impact crater that lies within the large walled plain Fermi, near the north-northwestern inner rim. Less than one crater diameter to the west-northwest is the slightly larger Delporte. Litke is located on the far side of the Moon and cannot be viewed directly from the Earth.

The rim of Litke is circular to the east and south, but the northern and western rims have been pushed inward somewhat. The west rim is irregular and broken through by a pair of worn depressions. Along the northern side slumped deposits form a pile along the base of the inner wall. A small craterlet lies along the southern rim and a small crater is attached to the exterior along the eastern side. The interior floor of litke has a low scarp that is nearly concentric with the eastern and southern sides. There is a small crater located on the interior floor just to the east of the midpoint.

References

External links
 LTO-101B1 Litke — L&PI topographic map

Impact craters on the Moon